The Hürtgen forest (also: Huertgen Forest) is located along the border between Belgium and Germany, in the southwest corner of the German federal state of North Rhine-Westphalia. Scarcely  in area, the forest lies within a triangle outlined by the German towns of Aachen, Monschau, and Düren. The Rur River runs along the forest's eastern edge.

Geography

The Hürtgen Forest lies at the northern edge of the Eifel mountains and High Fens – Eifel Nature Park; its terrain is characterized by plunging valleys that carve through broad plateaus.  Unlike many areas of Germany in which the valleys are farmed and hilltops are wooded, the Hürtgen Forest's deep valleys are thickly wooded and the hilltop plateaus have been cleared for agriculture.  The forest's rough terrain starkly contrasts with that of the adjoining Rhine Valley.  Roads in the forest are few, winding, and narrow.

Battle of Hürtgen Forest

During World War II the rugged terrain of this area was the scene of the long, bloody, drawn-out Battle of Hürtgen Forest, which took place over three months during a cold winter from 19 September 1944 to 16 December 1944. The Germans successfully defended the area while gaining time to launch a surprise counter offensive in the Ardennes on 16 December 1944, the Battle of the Bulge.

The forest was further devastated by fires in the summer of 1945, ignited as the weather warmed leftover white phosphorus munitions.

The battle is commemorated in the 1944 Hürtgen Forest Museum, opened in 1983. There are three German war cemeteries; the one at Hürtgen was opened in 1952 and is the resting place of some one hundred postwar victims of mines and unexploded ordnance. Beside other small memorials, the road that rises from the Kall River Valley to the town of Schmidt incorporated the track of a destroyed Sherman tank.

References

External links

Düren (district)
Forests and woodlands of North Rhine-Westphalia